Hold the Dark is a 2018 American action thriller film directed by  Jeremy Saulnier from a screenplay by Macon Blair. It is based upon the novel of the same name by William Giraldi. The film stars Jeffrey Wright, Alexander Skarsgård, James Badge Dale, Riley Keough, Tantoo Cardinal, and Julian Black Antelope. The film had its world premiere at the Toronto International Film Festival on September 12, 2018 and was released on September 28, 2018, by Netflix.

Plot
In December 2004, Russell Core (Jeffrey Wright), a writer who studies wolf behavior, is summoned to the village of Keelut, Alaska by Medora Slone (Riley Keough). Medora wants him to hunt down the wolves blamed for the disappearance of three small children, including her 6-year-old son Bailey. Core stays at her house, and unsuccessfully tries to convince her that this is not wolf behavior. Medora tells him that there is darkness there, and tells him of a hot springs to the north of town, which is the only warm place she's ever known.  She also says her husband is away fighting in the war, and that he told her he would never leave her. In the middle of the night, Core wakes and sees Medora scrubbing her skin in the bath. When she is finished, she has a wolf mask on then removes it and lies down naked next to Core without saying anything and puts his hand on her neck.

Overseas in Iraq, Medora's husband, Vernon (Alexander Skarsgård), returns gunfire on a truck with insurgents. Later, while stationed at a city checkpoint, Vernon discovers another American soldier raping a local woman. Vernon wounds the rapist with a knife and hands the bloody weapon to the woman. Leaving her house, he is ambushed and shot by a sniper, but survives. As he is airlifted away, Vernon mumbles Bailey's name.

In the morning, Core sets off to track the wolves, and meets Illanaq, an old native woman who tells him he is going the wrong way, and that Medora "knows evil". Core finds the hot springs Medora mentioned, and spots a pack of wolves eating their young. Unwilling to shoot them, Core returns to Keelut. At the Slone house, he finds Medora missing and discovers Bailey's frozen, strangled body in the cellar. The police investigate, and native villagers claim Medora is possessed by a wolf-demon called a tournaq.

Cheeon (Julian Black Antelope), a father to another missing child, meets Vernon at the airport and takes his friend to the morgue to identify Bailey's body. They meet police chief Donald Marium (James Badge Dale), Core, and other police officers. After Core and Marium leave, Vernon kills the officers and the coroner and takes Bailey's body. Cheeon builds a coffin and Vernon buries his son in the snow after marking the body with his blood, a Yup'ik burial ritual.

After Vernon reads and burns the case file, he visits Illanaq. She tells him the wolves had come before and claims no responsibility for what happened. She recalls how influenza once spread through the village and took the lives of many, with nowhere to bury them with the ground frozen.

Discovering the officers and coroner murdered and Bailey's body missing, Marium realizes Vernon is responsible and mobilizes his men. Remembering the old woman's warning, Core returns to Keelut only to find Illanaq dead in her home. As he steps outside, several police vehicles arrive in pursuit of Vernon and Cheeon.

After the officers take up position around Cheeon's house and Marium offers him an opportunity to surrender, Cheeon opens fire with an M60 machine gun. A shootout ensues, with many officers wounded and killed, before Marium can sneak into the house and kill Cheeon.

At an inn outside a tourist mine where Medora was sighted, Vernon meets John, an elderly hunter who treated him with wolf-oil as a child for his apparent psychopathy. At John's invitation, Vernon takes a mask from the wall, dons it, and kills the old man. On his way to his truck, the innkeeper shoots him in the shoulder. He visits Shan, an old friend, to treat his wound. Waking up from a dream of himself and Medora in the hot springs, Vernon overhears Shan talking to the police and kills him.

Core and Marium theorize that Medora went to the springs and resolve to find her before Vernon does. Core and Marium fly out in a small bush plane and search the terrain north of Keelut. After spotting the springs and landing nearby, they hike into the forest where Vernon kills Marium with an arrow through the neck. Core races to the springs, and warns Medora her husband is coming. Before they can flee, Vernon shoots Core in the chest with an arrow. Vernon strangles Medora until she pushes the mask off his face and he releases her. They embrace as Core falls unconscious.

After Core awakens, Vernon removes the arrow and leaves with Medora. Core crawls outside the cave, encountering a pack of wolves, and is rescued by a father and son. Vernon and Medora dig up Bailey's grave, and pull the coffin behind them as they trek through the snow. Core wakes up in the hospital with his daughter Amy at his bedside.

Cast
 Jeffrey Wright as Russell Core
 Alexander Skarsgård as Vernon Slone
 James Badge Dale as Chief Donald Marium
 Riley Keough as Medora Slone
 Julian Black Antelope as Cheeon
 Macon Blair as Shan
 Tantoo Cardinal as Illanaq
 Peter McRobbie as Trapper John
 Beckham Crawford as Bailey Slone
 Jonathan Whitesell as Arnie
 Bobbi Jaye as Amy Core

Production
In September 2015, it was announced Jeremy Saulnier would direct the film, based upon a screenplay by Macon Blair; while Eva Maria Daniels, Russell Ackerman and John Schoenfelder would produce the film under their VisionChaos Productions banner and Addictive Pictures banners respectively, A24 would distribute the film. In January 2017, Netflix acquired distribution rights to the film, with Anish Savjani and Neil Kopp joining as producers. In February 2017, Alexander Skarsgård, Riley Keough, James Bloor, James Badge Dale and Jeffrey Wright joined the cast of the film.

Filming
Principal photography began on February 27, 2017, and concluded on April 26, 2017. Filming took place in and around the areas surrounding Calgary, Drumheller and Kananaskis Country, Alberta, which were used to substitute for Alaska.

Release
It had its world premiere at the Toronto International Film Festival on September 12, 2018. It also screened at Fantastic Fest on September 22, 2018. It was released on September 28, 2018.

Critical reception

Hold the Dark received generally positive reviews from critics. The website's critical consensus they, "Hold the Darks unsettling aesthetic offers more of what filmgoers expect from director Jeremy Saulnier — and is often enough to prop up shaky narrative underpinnings." Metacritic, which uses a weighted average, assigned a score of 63 out of 100 based on 26 critics, indicating "generally favorable reviews".

References

External links

2018 films
American action thriller films
Films set in Alaska
English-language Netflix original films
Films directed by Jeremy Saulnier
Films based on American novels
Incest in film
2010s English-language films
2010s American films